ROCS Tzu I (子儀, PFG2-1107) is the fifth of eight Taiwanese-built Cheng Kung-class frigates of the Republic of China Navy, based on the Oliver Hazard Perry class.

Construction and career 
Laid down on 7 August 1994 and launched on 13 July 1995, Tzu I was commissioned in service in January 1997. The Cheng Kung-class frigates have the same length as the later Oliver Hazard Perry frigates, but have a different weapon and electronics fit.

Like her sister ships, Tzu I was built under license by China SB Corp. at Kaohsiung City, Taiwan, ROC.

, Tzu I is homeported at Tso-Ying naval base.

Gallery

See also

References

Cheng Kung-class frigates
Ships built in the Republic of China
1995 ships
Frigates of the Republic of China